The Dreamer was a variety show program aired by KBS2 that talks about esports with popular esports players.

Broadcast time

Performer

Host 
 Kim Hee-chul
 Park So-hyeon (Announcer)

Appearance 
 Jeon Yong-joon
 Lee Hyunwoo
 Faker
 Moon Ho Joon

Viewership ratings

References

External links 
 Naver TV
 Kakao TV

2020 South Korean television series debuts
Korean-language television shows
2020 South Korean television series endings